The National Centre for Atmospheric Science (NCAS) is research centre dedicated to the advancement of atmospheric science, funded by the Natural Environment Research Council (NERC). NCAS is one of the NERC's six research centres, and was formed in 2002 to provide the UK with national capability in atmospheric science research and technology.

NCAS research programmes include:

 Climate change science (including climate modelling and predictions)
 Atmospheric composition (including air quality modelling and predictions)
 Weather (including hazardous weather)
 Technologies for observing and modelling the atmosphere

NCAS provides UK researchers with scientific facilities and services that enable excellent atmospheric science at a national scale. These include a world-leading aircraft, ground-based instrumentation, and access to computer models and facilities for storing and accessing scientific data. NCAS is not based in one location, its staff, facilities and services are distributed across many UK universities and related institutions.

The head office is based in Leeds: National Centre For Atmospheric Science Fairbairn House 71-75 Clarendon Road Leeds LS2 9PH Tel: +44 (0) 113 34 36408

References

External links 

Atmospheric sciences
Climate of the United Kingdom
Natural Environment Research Council
Organisations based in Leeds
Research institutes in West Yorkshire
University of Leeds
Air pollution in the United Kingdom